Fred J. Weber (October 6, 1919 – May 11, 2007) was a justice of the Montana Supreme Court from 1981 to 1995.

Education, military service, and career
Born in Deer Lodge, Montana, to Victor and Dorothy Weber, he received his B.A. and J.D. degrees from the University of Montana. During World War II, Weber enlisted in the ROTC, and later joined the 10th Mountain Division, serving in the infantry.

Weber engaged in the private practice of law in Havre, Montana, from 1947 to 1980, when he was elected to one of two newly-created seats the Montana Supreme Court, where he remained for fifteen years.

Personal life and death
In June 1951, Weber married Phyllis Schell, with whom he had three sons and a daughter.

Weber died at his apartment in Helena at the age of 87.

References

Justices of the Montana Supreme Court
1919 births
2007 deaths
University of Montana alumni
United States Army personnel of World War II